Remix Classics is a compilation album of remixes released by rapper, Master P. It was released on September 20, 2005 through Koch Records and managed to make it to #81 on the Top R&B/Hip-Hop Albums and #47 on the Top Independent Albums.

Track listing

References 

Master P albums
2005 remix albums
E1 Music remix albums
Gangsta rap remix albums